Henry Thiele Restaurant, or Henry Thiele's, was a restaurant located at 2315 Northwest Westover Road in Portland, Oregon.

Description and history 
Established on April 14, 1932, the restaurant was "an immediate success, offering an extensive, European-influenced menu that changed every day". According to the Oregon Encyclopedia, "Henry Thiele's was especially noted for its salmon dishes, lentils and wurst, Princess Charlotte pudding, and an enormous and puffy egg-and-lemon-and-powdered-sugar dish known as a German pancake or Dutch baby (served on a turkey platter)." Eater Portland has called the restaurant a "landmark for continental cuisine", serving German pancakes, buttered noodles with beef tips until the 1990s. The business operated in a white stucco building with a red tile roof. 

The restaurant was sold in 1990 and demolished in 1992. The shopping center Thiele Square, built in 1995, has a commemorative plaque.

See also

 List of defunct restaurants of the United States
 List of German restaurants

References

External links
 Henry Thiele's restaurant, ca. 1932, WSU Libraries Digital Collections
 Henry Thiele's Restaurant Menu (1939)
 Cookbook:Henry Thiele's Pancake at Wikibooks

1932 establishments in Oregon
1990s disestablishments in Oregon
Defunct European restaurants in Portland, Oregon
Defunct German restaurants in the United States
Demolished buildings and structures in Portland, Oregon
German restaurants in Portland, Oregon
Hillside, Portland, Oregon
Restaurants disestablished in 1990